Jack Cole (April 27, 1911 – February 17, 1974) was an American dancer, choreographer, and theatre director known as "the Father of Theatrical Jazz Dance".

Early life
Jack Cole made his professional dance debut with Denishawn at Lewisohn Stadium in New York City in August 1930. He began his training as a modern dancer only six weeks prior, studying with Ruth St. Denis and Ted Shawn. He was entranced by the Asian influences their dance school utilized in its choreography and costuming. He also performed briefly with Humphrey-Weidman, and was influenced by the pioneering modernists Doris Humphrey and Charles Weidman. Eager to make a living as a dancer during the Depression, he soon left the modern dance world and opted for opportunities in nightclubs, where he first partnered with Alice Dudley, then for years danced in a trio with Anna Austin and Florence Lessing.

Cole's career trajectory was unique for an American dance artist. He started at the very roots of modern dance, then segued into a blazing commercial career in nightclubs across the nation, first at Manhattan's Embassy Club, then opening the Rainbow Room on its inaugural evening in October 1934. His career spanned three major arenas: nightclub, Broadway stage, and Hollywood film. He ended his career as a popular coach to Hollywood stars and an innovative choreographer for the camera.

Career

Cole was a performer in Broadway musicals, starting with The Dream of Sganarelle in 1933. His first Broadway credit as a choreographer was Something for the Boys in 1943. Cole is credited with choreographing and/or directing the stage musicals Alive and Kicking, Magdalena, Carnival in Flanders, Zenda, Foxy, Kismet, A Funny Thing Happened on the Way to the Forum, Kean, Donnybrook!, Jamaica, and Man of La Mancha.

The Jack Cole Dancers performed in nightclubs in the late 1930s, including the Rainbow Room.

Cole was a pioneer for multiculturalism in the musical comedy dance arena. For all of his training and work under Ruth St. Denis, he was unimpressed by the surface level imitation of eastern dance traditions she put forth. He was inspired, however, to pursue the incorporation of more authentic elements of cultural dancing into his work, so he studied a number of traditional foreign dance forms. Cole famously became well versed in​​ bharata nāṭyam, India’s oldest dance technique, under dancers Uday Shankar and La Meri. Throughout the 1930s his interests expanded to Latin American and Caribbean dances. He also studied Flamenco with Paco Cansino, film star Rita Hayworth’s Uncle.

These techniques were combined with popular social dances of the 1920s and 30s such as the Charleston and the Lindy, dances he noted “all stemming from African dance” and the Caribbean. Acrobatic knee slides were another signature of Cole, which were likely inspired by The Nicholas Brothers’ tap dance act in the 1930s and 40s.

The large Cuban migration to New York in the late 40s also brought the mambo, rumba, and cha-cha-cha to the center of dance halls, and Cole drew from these vocabularies as well.

As a white catholic man, some critics challenge Cole’s fixation on exotic national and religious dances. Dance historian Constance Valis Hill allows that the elements of ethnic dance he pulled from were either “absorbed, borrowed, or appropriated.” Regardless, she says, Cole honors the aesthetics of the cultural dances he uses by weaving them into works without altering their shapes or rhythms.

One of the most representative examples of Jack Cole’s fusion of bharata nāṭyam with popular jazz music is the body of work he labelled “Hindu Swing.”  One critic of Indian dance said that Cole “[performed] authentic Indian dance technique to swing tempos without losing the general dignity of the art.”

His film work includes Moon Over Miami, Cover Girl, Tonight and Every Night, Gilda,  Down to Earth, The Merry Widow, Meet Me After the Show, Gentlemen Prefer Blondes, On the Riviera,  There's No Business Like Show Business, The I Don't Care Girl, The Thrill of Brazil, Kismet, Les Girls, Let's Make Love, Some Like it Hot, Designing Woman, Three for the Show, Lydia Bailey, Eadie Was a Lady and many others. He was famous in Hollywood for his work with Rita Hayworth, Betty Grable, Jane Russell, Mitzi Gaynor and Marilyn Monroe. Cole worked closely with Monroe in particular, influencing her iconic performance in "Diamonds are a Girl's Best Friend" from Gentlemen Prefer Blondes, and in five other films. Although Howard Hawks is credited as the sole director of "Gentlemen Prefer Blondes", both the film's co-star Jane Russell and assistant choreographer Gwen Verdon contend that Monroe's iconic musical number, "Diamonds Are a Girl's Best Friend", was actually directed by choreographer Cole. Russell said, "Howard Hawks had nothing to do with the musical numbers. He was not even there."

Legacy
Cole virtually invented the idiom of American show dancing known as "theatrical jazz dance." He developed a mode of jazz-ethnic-ballet that prevails as the dominant dancing style in today's musicals, films, nightclub revues, television commercials and music videos. According to Martin Gottfried, Cole "won a place in choreographic history for developing the basic vocabulary of jazz dancing—the kind of dancing done in nightclubs and Broadway musicals."

Cole-style dancing is acrobatic and angular, using small groups of dancers rather than a large company; it is closer to the glittering nightclub floor show than to the ballet stage.

Cole is remembered as the prime innovator of the theatrical jazz dance heritage.

Cole's unmistakable style endures in the work of Gwen Verdon, Bob Fosse, Jerome Robbins, Gower Champion, Peter Gennaro, Michael Bennett, Tommy Tune, Patsy Swayze, Alvin Ailey (who was a dancer in the musical Jamaica), and countless other dancers and choreographers including Wayne Lamb. Verdon said that "Jack influenced all the choreographers in the theater from Jerome Robbins, Michael Kidd, Bob Fosse down to Michael Bennett and Ron Field today. When you see dancing on television, that's Jack Cole." Verdon was Cole's assistant for seven years.

If not for Cole, it is unlikely Gwen Verdon would have gone on to achieve fame as a dancer; without his instruction, many now-immortal stage and screen actresses probably would not be remembered as dancers today.

Cole's choreography in the "Diamonds are a Girl's Best Friend" sequence in the film Gentlemen Prefer Blondes was reinterpreted by Madonna for her music video of "Material Girl".

Critics of Cole’s earlier work in nightclubs dismissed it as commercial and low art, but by permeating Broadway and Hollywood with his signature style he revealed the closed-mindedness of this way of thinking and gave further integrity to such commercial dance settings. Even so, and despite being a predecessor and inspiration to many better known dance artists, he lacks the name recognition enjoyed by the likes of Bob Fosse and Jerome Robbins.

After the disbanding of Denishawn Dance, Cole’s continued working relationship with Ted Shawn placed him in the small group of dancers that helped Shawn found the renowned summer dance hub, Jacob’s Pillow. 79 years later, Jacob’s Pillow faculty member Chet Walker, best known for performing in Bob Fosse musicals and his later creation of the tribute musical “Fosse,” also conceived a Jack Cole tribute musical titled Heat Wave: The Jack Cole Project, given its world premiere in May 2012 at Queens Theatre in New York's Flushing Meadows Corona Park.

See also
 List of dancers

References

External links

Archival footage of Jacob's Pillow PillowTalk: Jack Cole, Unsung Genius, 8/14/2010
Archival footage of Jacob's Pillow PillowTalk: Jack Cole: Unsung Genius, 8/14/2010
Levine, Debra. "Jack Cole" The Dance Heritage Coalition, America's 100 Irreplaceable Dance Treasures, 2012
The Jack Cole Scrapbook Collection is held by the Victoria and Albert Museum Theatre and Performance Department.

1911 births
1974 deaths
American choreographers
American jazz dancers
Donaldson Award winners
Artists from New Brunswick, New Jersey
LGBT choreographers
20th-century American LGBT people